Ganesh Bagler is known for his research  in computational gastronomy, an emerging data science of food, flavors and health. By blending food with data and computation he has helped establish the foundations of this niche area. Starting with the investigation of food pairing in the Indian cuisine, his lab has contributed to computational gastronomy with studies on culinary fingerprints of world cuisines, culinary evolution, benevolent health impacts of spices, and taste prediction algorithms.

Education 
Bagler completed his schooling from Sharada School and Siddheshwar High School, Solapur in the western peninsular Indian state of Maharashtra. He did his graduation in Physics (B.Sc., 1997) from Sangameshwar College, Shivaji University and master's studies (M.Sc. Physics, 1999) from Savitribai Phule Pune University, Pune. He moved to University of Hyderabad for M.Tech. in Computational Techniques, before joining Centre for Cellular and Molecular Biology for his Ph.D. research in Computational Biology. His Ph.D. research involved investigation of graph theoretical models of protein structures  which led to the observation of exceptional assortative mixing in graph theoretical models of protein structures.

Career 
After the postdoctoral research stint in computational neuroscience at the National Centre for Biological Sciences as a visiting fellow, he joined the Max Planck Institute for Molecular Genetics in Prof. Michael Lappe's (Otto Warburg Laboratory, Bioinformatics/Structural Proteomics) group. He returned to India to join CSIR-Institute of Himalayan Bioresource Technology as a Scientist. In April 2013, he moved to Indian Institute of Technology Jodhpur as an assistant professor. After a brief stint at Dhirubhai Ambani Institute of Information and Communication Technology as an assistant professor, he moved to Indraprastha Institute of Information Technology (IIIT-Delhi) on a tenure track position. There, he is affiliated to the Center for Computational Biology  and Department of Computational Biology  and has been developing the Computational Gastronomy niche in his lab, the Complex Systems Laboratory.

Research 
Ganesh Bagler's research  has been rooted in investigation of complex systems, primarily of biological origin: protein structure-function, kinetics, folding, and design; complex network models transportation systems; molecular interactome models of complex diseases; controllability of biological networks; in silico drug discovery; systems biological investigation of brain networks; modeling and prediction of phenotypic side effects of drugs; computational models of biological systems; and computational gastronomy.

Science communication and outreach 
Ganesh Bagler has keen interest in science, technology, engineering, and mathematics (STEM) education and public outreach for communicating science. He has been engaged in propagating the cause of leveraging computational gastronomy for data-driven food innovations on various platforms: TEDx; HasGeek's Kilter 2017; Discussion Meeting on Mathematical and Statistical Explorations in Disease Modeling and Public Health at the International Centre for Theoretical Sciences; 7th IFCA  International Chefs Congress; IIT Guwahati Research Conclave 2017; GD Goenka University Le Cordon Bleu India's  iHOST 2017; Cadence Advanced Technology Talk; 2nd International Meeting on Systems Medicine (Utrecht, Netherlands); Food Safety and Standards Authority of India's (FSSAI) EatRight Mela; Bangalore Science Forum; and SIAL Paris Conference 2019 . He has organized two editions of Computational Gastronomy Symposiums at IIIT-Delhi. He conducts the 'Open Computational Gastronomy' course on Google Classroom

Controversy 
In April 2015, soon after his research reporting the food pairing investigation of Indian cuisine was touted as an emerging technology by the MIT Technology Review, Bagler was unceremoniously removed from the position of assistant professor at the Indian Institute of Technology Jodhpur in a controversial decision. The students protested against the decision of termination.  Ministry of Human Resource Development constituted a three-member committee for the investigation of the matter. Subsequently, Bagler moved to Indraprastha Institute of Information Technology on a tenure track position  and has graduated his PhD students  from Indian Institute of Technology Jodhpur. He has been tenured and promoted to the position of Associate Professor at Indraprastha Institute of Information Technology.

Selected bibliography

References 

1977 births
Living people
Computational biologists
People from New Delhi
Savitribai Phule Pune University alumni
University of Hyderabad alumni
Shivaji University alumni
Academic staff of the Indian Institutes of Technology